The Redlands California Temple is the 116th operating temple of the Church of Jesus Christ of Latter-day Saints (LDS Church).

History
The announcement of a temple in Redlands, California came on April 21, 2001. Redlands is in the San Bernardino, California area, an area which since 1851 has had a large population of Mormons, some of whom are descendants of colonists that first established the community.  The original community was established at the behest of Brigham Young but the settlers were called back to Utah in 1857.

The site for the Redlands California Temple was dedicated in December 2001 and construction began soon after. Church members helped in the construction by donating rocks for its building. Some of these rocks were from the area where the original Mormon colonists of 1851 camped. Young children also donated their pennies to buy the palm trees that are now planted around the temple. It houses two ordinance rooms and three sealing rooms.

From August 9 through September 6, 2003 an open house was held for the Redlands temple. About 11,000 people volunteered to help with the open house and more than 140,000 people were able to tour the temple and learn more about the purpose of LDS temples. The temple was built on a lot that originally was home to an orange grove; during the open house visitors were served orange juice made from the trees that once stood there.

LDS Church president Gordon B. Hinckley dedicated the Redlands California Temple on September 14, 2003. Thousands of members attended the four dedication services. The Redlands temple was the fifth to be built in California. It serves approximately 70,000 LDS members in the area.

In 2020, the Redlands California Temple was closed in response to the coronavirus pandemic.

See also

 Comparison of temples of The Church of Jesus Christ of Latter-day Saints
 List of temples of The Church of Jesus Christ of Latter-day Saints
 List of temples of The Church of Jesus Christ of Latter-day Saints by geographic region
 Temple architecture (Latter-day Saints)
 The Church of Jesus Christ of Latter-day Saints in California

References

External links
 
 Official Redlands California Temple page
 Redlands California Temple at ChurchofJesusChristTemples.org

21st-century Latter Day Saint temples
Religious buildings and structures in San Bernardino County, California
Buildings and structures in Redlands, California
Religious buildings and structures completed in 2003
Temples (LDS Church) in California
2003 establishments in California